The Literary Youth Who Can Dance  is the fourth studio album by Chinese singer Li Yuchun, released on April 12, 2011 by EE Media.

Track listing

Music videos
I Sing La La La 我唱啦啦啦
I'm Sorry But Suddenly Miss You 对不起﹐只是忽然很想你
The Literary Youth Who Can Dance 会跳舞的文艺青年
 Lost Heart Crazy 失心疯

References

2011 albums
Chinese-language albums
Li Yuchun albums